Richard L. Abel (born September 13, 1941) is a Professor of Law (now emeritus), a specialist in African Law Studies and a renowned socio-legal scholar. He received his B.A. from Harvard University (1962), his LL.B. from Columbia University (1965) and his Ph.D. from the University of London (1974) where he was a Marshall Scholar. He has been a member of the faculty of the UCLA School of Law since 1974. He is a past president of the Law and Society Association and editor of the Law & Society Review.

Selected publications 
 "Contesting Legality in the United States After September 11", in Fighting for Political Freedom: Comparative Studies of the Legal Complex and Political Liberalism, edited by Terence Halliday, Lucien Karpik, and Malcolm Feeley (Onati International Series in Law and Society). Oxford (2008).
 English Lawyers between Market and State: The Politics of Professionalism (2003).
 Speaking Respect, Respecting Speech (1998).
 Politics by Other Means: Law in the Struggle Against Apartheid, 1980–1994 (1995);
 (edited with Philip S.C. Lewis) Lawyers in Society. An Overview. (1995).
 "Transnational Law Practice", 44 Case Western Reserve Law Review (1993), 737;
 The Politics of Informal Justice (editor, 1982).
 (with William Felstiner and Austin sarat) "The Emergence and Transformation of Disputes: Naming, Blaming, Claiming" 15 Law & Society Review, (1980), 631.

References

External links 
 Richard Abel

Living people
Harvard College alumni
Columbia Law School alumni
Alumni of the University of London
UCLA School of Law faculty
Legal educators
1941 births